Karl Vanlouwe (born 22 October 1970 in Nieuwpoort, Belgium) is a Belgian politician and is affiliated to the N-VA. He was elected as a member of the Belgian Senate in 2010. Since 2015 he is a member of the European Alliance Group at the European Committee of the Regions.

Notes

Living people
Members of the Senate (Belgium)
New Flemish Alliance politicians
1970 births
People from Nieuwpoort, Belgium
21st-century Belgian politicians
Belgian senators of the 57th legislature